The 1998 DFB-Pokal Final decided the winner of the 1997–98 DFB-Pokal, the 55th season of Germany's premier knockout football cup competition. It was played on 16 May 1998 at the Olympiastadion in Berlin. Bayern Munich won the match 2–1 against MSV Duisburg to claim their ninth cup title.

Route to the final
The DFB-Pokal began with 64 teams in a single-elimination knockout cup competition. There were a total of five rounds leading up to the final. Teams were drawn against each other, and the winner after 90 minutes would advance. If still tied, 30 minutes of extra time was played. If the score was still level, a penalty shoot-out was used to determine the winner.

Note: In all results below, the score of the finalist is given first (H: home; A: away).

Match

Details

References

External links
 Match report at kicker.de 
 Match report at WorldFootball.net
 Match report at Fussballdaten.de 

FC Bayern Munich matches
MSV Duisburg matches
1997–98 in German football cups
1998
May 1998 sports events in Europe
1998 in Berlin
Football competitions in Berlin